The Journal of Artificial Intelligence Research (JAIR) is an open access peer-reviewed scientific journal covering research in all areas of artificial intelligence.

History 
It was established in 1993 as one of the first scientific journals distributed online. Paper volumes are printed by the AAAI Press. The Journal for Artificial Intelligence Research (JAIR) is one of the premier publication venues in artificial intelligence. JAIR also stands out in that, since its launch in 1993, it has been 100% open-access and non-profit.

Content 
The Journal of Artificial Intelligence Research (JAIR) is dedicated to the rapid dissemination of important research results to the global artificial intelligence (AI) community. The journal’s scope encompasses all areas of AI, including agents and multi-agent systems, automated reasoning, constraint processing and search, knowledge representation, machine learning, natural language, planning and scheduling, robotics and vision, and uncertainty in AI.

Abstracting and indexing 
The journal is abstracted and indexed by Inspec, Science Citation Index, and MathSciNet. According to the Journal Citation Reports, the journal has a 2019 impact factor of 2.441.

According to the SciMago Journal and Country Rank, the journal is ranked 8th among all open access computer science journals with an H-index of 112.

However, according to Google Scholar in 2021 it only has an h5-index of 38, which suggests some potential issues in measuring its impact.

References

External links
 

Computer science journals
Open access journals
Publications established in 1993
English-language journals
Artificial intelligence publications